The Wisconsin Wolves are a Women's Football Alliance (WFA) team  based in Wausau, Wisconsin. The team was founded in 2006 and play their home games at Lussier Stadium on the campus of Madison La Follette High School. The Wolves were the third Wisconsin WPFL franchise founded in the state (following the Wisconsin Riveters and the Kenosha Northern Ice) but have transferred to the IWFL. In 2010, The Wisconsin Wolves announced they were moving the team to Wausau, Wisconsin, as well as IWFL. They joined the Women's Football Alliance (WFA) shortly after. They will begin playing in 2011.

The Wolves completed their inaugural (2006) regular season with a record of (5-3). Their 2007 season ended in the same way, 5-3 in the regular season and 1-1 in the playoffs. The Wolves have played in the National Conference Championship in their first two seasons of existence.

Season-By-Season

|-
| colspan="6" align="center" | Wisconsin Wolves (WPFL)
|-
|2006 || 5 || 2 || 0 || 2nd National Central || Won National Conference Qualifier (Indiana)Lost National Conference Championship (Houston)
|-
|2007 || 5 || 3 || 0 || 2nd National Central || Won National Conference Qualifier (Indiana)Lost National Conference Championship (Houston)
|-
| colspan="6" align="center" | Wisconsin Wolves (IWFL)
|-
|2008 || 4 || 4 || 0 || 3rd Tier I East Midwest || --
|-
|2009 || colspan="6" align="center" | X-Team - Results Unknown/Not Counted
|-
|2010 || 4 || 4 || 0 || 3rd Tier II West Midwest || --
|-
| colspan="6" align="center" | Wisconsin Wolves (WFA)
|-
|2011 || 4 || 4 || 0 || 2nd American Upper Midwest || 
|-
|2012* || 2 || 2 || 0 || 2nd WFA American 10 || --
|-
|Totals || 24 || 19 || 0
|colspan="2"| (including playoffs)

* = Current Standing

2011

Standings

Season schedule

2012

Season schedule

References

External links
Wisconsin Wolves Official Website

Women's Football Alliance
Sports in Wisconsin
American football teams established in 2006
2006 establishments in Wisconsin
Women in Wisconsin